The 2021–22 UEFA Europa Conference League group stage began on 14 September 2021 and ended on 9 December 2021. A total of 32 teams competed in the group stage to decide 16 of the 24 places in the knockout phase of the 2021–22 UEFA Europa Conference League.

Alashkert, Bodø/Glimt, Flora, Kairat, Lincoln Red Imps, Mura, Randers and Union Berlin made their debut appearances in a UEFA competition group stage. Alashkert, Flora and Lincoln Red Imps were the first teams from Armenia, Estonia and Gibraltar, respectively, to play in a UEFA competition group stage.

Draw
The draw for the group stage was held on 27 August 2021, 13:30 CEST (14:30 TRT), in Istanbul, Turkey. The 32 teams were drawn into eight groups of four. For the draw, the teams were seeded into four pots, each of eight teams, based on their 2021 UEFA club coefficients. Teams from the same association, and due to political reasons, teams from Azerbaijan and Armenia, could not be drawn into the same group. Prior to the draw, UEFA formed pairings of teams from the same association, including those playing in the Europa League group stage (one pairing for associations with two or three teams, two pairings for associations with four or five teams), based on television audiences, where one team was drawn into Groups A–D and another team was drawn into Groups E–H, so that the two teams would have different kick-off times. The following pairings were announced by UEFA after the group stage teams were confirmed (the second team in a pairing marked by UEL played in the Europa League group stage):

 A  Slavia Prague and Jablonec
 B  Copenhagen and Randers
 C  AZ and Vitesse
 D  PAOK and Olympiacos (UEL)
 E  Rennes and Monaco (UEL)
 F  Maccabi Tel Aviv and Maccabi Haifa
 G  Partizan and Red Star Belgrade (UEL)
 H  Omonia and Anorthosis Famagusta
 K  Feyenoord and PSV Eindhoven (UEL)
 L  CSKA Sofia and Ludogorets Razgrad (UEL)

On each matchday, one set of four groups played their matches on 18:45 CET/CEST, while the other set of four groups played their matches on 21:00 CET/CEST, with the two sets of groups alternating between each matchday. The fixtures were decided after the draw, using a computer draw not shown to public. Each team did not play more than two home matches or two away matches in a row, and did play one home match and one away match on the first and last matchdays (Regulations Article 15.02).

Teams
Below were the participating teams (with their 2021 UEFA club coefficients), grouped by their seeding pot. They included:
22 winners of the play-off round (5 from Champions Path, 17 from Main Path)
10 losers of the Europa League play-off round

Notes

Format
In each group, teams played against each other home-and-away in a round-robin format. The winners of each group advanced to the round of 16, while the runners-up advanced to the knockout round play-offs. The third-placed and fourth-placed teams were eliminated from European competitions for the season.

Tiebreakers
Teams were ranked according to points (3 points for a win, 1 point for a draw, 0 points for a loss). If two or more teams were tied on points, the following tiebreaking criteria were applied, in the order given, to determine the rankings (see Article 16 Equality of points – group stage, Regulations of the UEFA Europa Conference League):
Points in head-to-head matches among the tied teams;
Goal difference in head-to-head matches among the tied teams;
Goals scored in head-to-head matches among the tied teams;
If more than two teams were tied, and after applying all head-to-head criteria above, a subset of teams were still tied, all head-to-head criteria above were reapplied exclusively to this subset of teams;
Goal difference in all group matches;
Goals scored in all group matches;
Away goals scored in all group matches;
Wins in all group matches;
Away wins in all group matches;
Disciplinary points (direct red card = 3 points; double yellow card = 3 points; single yellow card = 1 point);
UEFA club coefficient.
Due to the abolition of the away goals rule, head-to-head away goals were no longer applied as a tiebreaker starting from this season. However, total away goals were still applied as a tiebreaker.

Groups
The fixtures were announced on 28 August 2021, the day after the draw. The matches were played on 14 and 16 September, 30 September, 21 October, 4 November, 25 November, and 9 December 2021 (one home match of Maccabi Haifa and Maccabi Tel Aviv was played on a Tuesday, due to Yom Kippur, which lasted from sunset 15 September to nightfall 16 September). The scheduled kick-off times were 16:30, 18:45 and 21:00 CET/CEST (all three of Kairat's home matches were played at 16:30 CET/CEST due to the time difference of Kazakhstan, and the matches rescheduled for Tuesdays were also played at 16:30 CET/CEST to avoid conflicts with Champions League matches).

Times were CET/CEST, as listed by UEFA (local times, if different, are in parentheses).

Group A

Group B

Group C

Group D

Group E

Group F

Group G

Group H

Notes

References

External links

Fixtures and Results, 2021–22, UEFA.com

2
2021-22
September 2021 sports events in Europe
October 2021 sports events in Europe
November 2021 sports events in Europe
December 2021 sports events in Europe